(historically also Yongchang, Burmese:ပေါက်ရှန်) is a prefecture-level city in Western Yunnan Province, People's Republic of China. Baoshan is the second-biggest metropolitan area in western Yunnan after Dali.

Geography and climate

Baoshan is located between the border of Burma and the Lancang river (Mekong); specifically it borders the Burmese states of Kachin to the northwest and Shan to the south. The Nujiang (Salween River) flows through the entire length of the prefecture, north to south.

Tempered by the low latitude and moderate elevation, Baoshan has a mild subtropical highland climate (Köppen Cwb), with short, mild, dry winters and warm, rainy summers. The warmest month is June, which averages . Nearly three quarters of the annual rainfall occurs from June to October.

Demography
The prefecture has about 2.5 million inhabitants.

Administrative divisions
The city-prefecture of Baoshan has jurisdiction over five subdivisions—a district, one county-level city and three counties:

Tengyue, the other major populated area in the county, successfully lobbied for and achieved city status in 2015-16 and is currently in the process of separating itself and the surrounding Tengchong area from Baoshan administratively.

Ethnic groups

Bulang
According to the Baoshan Ethnic Gazetteer (2006:337), ethnic Bulang are distributed in the following villages within Baoshan City.

Shidian County
Mulaoyuan: Mulaoyuan, Hazhai, Dadi, Longtang
Bailang Township: Jici, Dazhong, Jianshan
Yaoguan Township: Duopo
Jiufang Township: Yakou
Changning County
Gengga Township: Baicaolin, Dachushui
Kasi Township
Xingu Village: Guban, Zhongzhai
Kasi Village: Shuanglong, Yingbaizhai, Ergoudi

De'ang
The Yaojing, a subgroup of the De'ang, are located in Baizhai, Laxian, and Dagoubian of Mangyan Village and Shiti Village in Lujiang Township, Longyang District (Baoshan Ethnic Gazetteer 2006:490-491).

Transport
Baoshan lies on the main road from Ruili on the Burmese border to Kunming. The Baoshan−Kunming section is completed highway, and the Baoshan-Ruili part was completed in 2016, finalizing the highway net crossing Yunnan east-to-west. It is the first finished highway between China and Myanmar.

Baoshan Yunrui Airport  has daily flights to and from Kunming.

The currently under construction Dali–Ruili railway will pass through Baoshan. Baoshan railway station will handle passenger services while Baoshan North will handle freight.

See also
Three Parallel Rivers of Yunnan Protected Areas - Unesco World Heritage Site
Gaoligong Mountain

References

External links
Baoshan City Official Site
Baoshan Travel and Tourism Bureau (zh, en, ja)
Baoshan News Network
Baoshan profile 
Baoshan map

 
Cities in Yunnan